This article is about the demographic features of the population of Tuvalu, including the age structure, ethnicity, education level, life expectancy, religious affiliations and other aspects of the population.

Summary of the demographics of Tuvalu

The population of Tuvalu is predominately of Polynesian ethnicity with approximately 5.6% of the population being Micronesian. Tuvaluans are ethnically related to the people of Samoa and Tonga. There is evidence for a dual genetic origin of Pacific Islanders in Asia and Melanesia, which results from an analysis of Y chromosome (NRY) and mitochondrial DNA (mtDNA) markers. There is also evidence of Fiji playing a pivotal role in west-to-east expansion within Polynesia.

The vast majority of Tuvaluans belong to the Church of Tuvalu, a Protestant denomination. Their ancestors were converted by Christian missionaries in the 19th century.

Infant mortality in Tuvalu was 25 deaths per 1,000 live births in 2012, with an under-five mortality rate of 30 deaths per 1,000 live births. There has been a consistent decline in the under-five mortality rate since 1990.

School attendance at school is 10 years for males and 11 years for females (2001). Adult literacy rate is 99.0% (2002).

 Primary school enrollment (2006): 100%
 Secondary school enrollment (2001): 79.5%

Life expectancy for women in Tuvalu is 68.41 years and 64.01 years for men (2015 est.).

The population of Tuvalu is recorded by the Central Statistics Department (CSD) of Tuvalu in the census information:

The net migration rate is estimated at -6.81 migrant(s)/1,000 population (2015 est.). The threat of global warming in Tuvalu is not a dominant motivation for migration as Tuvaluans appear to prefer to continue living on the islands for reasons of lifestyle, culture and identity.

The Census Monograph on Migration, Urbanization and Youth provides an analysis of the 2012 census and reported:
 A total of 1,200 people were listed as being out of country on census night with more males (57%) than females (43%) absent. The high proportion in range of ages 15 to 29 years (37% of the total) is described as indicating the significance of overseas tertiary education and training.
 The 2013 Census of New Zealand reported 3,537 Tuvaluans, an increase of 80% from the 1,965 reported in the 2001 census. In the 2013 census, only about 40% (1,419) had been born in Tuvalu. The high proportion of Tuvaluans who are New Zealand born illustrates the significance of New Zealand as a long term destination for Tuvaluan migrants.
 The Tuvaluan community in Australia is recorded in the 2011 Australian Census as 228 people who put Tuvaluan as their first response to a question on ‘ancestry’; of these 120 were born in Tuvalu.
 The islands of Nanumea, Nanumaga, Nukufetau and Niutao had relatively high net migration losses, with most being internal migrants to Funafuti. Vaitupu had the largest net migration gain, although this is attributed to the location of Motufoua Secondary School on Vaitupu and the movement of students from the other islands.

Population
The following demographic statistics are from the CIA World Factbook, unless otherwise indicated.

Age structure
0–14 years: 29.4% (male 1,639/female 1,557)
15–24 years: 20.27% (male 1,157/female 1,046)
25–54 years: 36.35% (male 1,946/female 2,005)
55–64 years: 8.41% (male 373/female 541)
65 years and over: 5.57% (male 247/female 358) (2015 est.)

Median age
Total: 25.2 years
Male: 24.1 years
Female: 26.6 years (2015 est.)

Population growth rate
0.82%

Net migration rate
-6.81 migrant(s)/1,000 population (2015 est.)

Sex ratio
At birth: 1.05 male(s)/female
0–14 years: 1.05 male(s)/female
15–24 years: 1.11 male(s)/female
25–54 years: 0.97 male(s)/female
55–64 years: 0.69 male(s)/female
65 years and over: 0.69 male(s)/female
Total population: 0.97 male(s)/female (2015 est.)

Vital statistics
Births and deaths

Infant mortality rate
Total: 30.8 deaths/1,000 live births
Male: 33.46 deaths/1,000 live births
Female: 28.01 deaths/1,000 live births

Life expectancy at birth
Total population: 66.16 years
Male: 64.01 years
Female: 68.41 years

Total fertility rate
3 children born/woman

Ethnic groups
Polynesian 96%
Micronesian 4%

Languages
Tuvaluan (official)
English (official)
Samoan
Ikiribati language (on the island of Nui)

Religions
 Church of Tuvalu 97%
 Seventh-day Adventist Church 1.4%
 Baháʼí 1%
 all other faiths or denominations

See also 

 Women in Tuvalu
 History of Tuvalu
 Religion in Tuvalu
 Geography of Tuvalu
 Princess Margaret Hospital

References
 Central Statistics Division – Government of Tuvalu
CIA World Factbook

 
Society of Tuvalu